Brixlegg is a market town (since 1927) in the Kufstein district in the Austrian state of Tyrol. The town lies in the Lower Inn Valley and at the entrance of the Alpbachtal.

Neighbouring municipalities
Alpbach, Kramsach, Radfeld, Rattenberg, Reith im Alpbachtal, Wildschönau

History 
The town was first mentioned as „Prisslech“ in documents in 788, although the settlement is considered to be much older.

Sights 

 Parish church "Unsere Liebe Frau" ("Our Lady")
 Mühlbichl chapel and war memorial
 Lanegg tower house
 Granary building on the bank of the river Inn
 Museum of Mining and Metallurgy

People 
 Stephan Eberharter, Alpine ski racer and Olympic champion
 Matthias Rebitsch, Alpinist
 Karlheinz Töchterle, Federal Minister of Science and Research
Karl Pearson visited here on Sunday 2 September 1883 and wrote about the passion play

Economy 
The Montanwerke Brixlegg AG is the only copper producer in Austria and specialises in the recovery of copper and other valuable metals from scrap copper and other secondary materials with copper content. The first mention of a copper and silver refinery in Brixlegg in documents dates back to 1463. At the beginning of the 20th century, following a decline in ore extraction in Tyrol, production was shifted to the recovery of copper from scrap metal alloys.

Further employers are the textiles industry (Giesswein company, founded in 1954), Production of bottled mineral water and non-alcoholic drinks (Silberquelle) and tourism (with a focus on winter tourism).

Sports 
It is famous amongst the skateboard scene for "The Cradle" a large outdoor skatearena, that also hosts international competitions.

Town twinning 
 Aichach (Germany)

References

External links 

 Official website 
 Museum of Mining and Metallurgy

Cities and towns in Kufstein District